John Vernon "Rocky" Stone (August 23, 1918 – November 12, 1986) was a Major League Baseball pitcher. Stone played for the Cincinnati Reds in 1943. In 13 career games, he had a 0–1 record, with a 4.38 ERA. He batted and threw right-handed.

Stone's only decision came on June 5 against the Boston Braves at Crosley Field. After pitching 3 innings of scoreless relief, he surrendered 2 runs in the top of the ninth inning; the Reds could not rally in their half of the inning leading to the 7–5 loss.

Stone was born in Redding, California, and died in Fountain Valley, California.

References

External links

1918 births
1986 deaths
Cincinnati Reds players
Major League Baseball pitchers
Baseball players from California
Ogden Reds players
Birmingham Barons players
Tulsa Oilers (baseball) players
Fresno Cardinals players